Osage City Municipal Airport  is a city-owned public-use airport located one nautical mile (1.6 km) east of the central business district of Osage City, a city in Osage County, Kansas, United States.

Facilities and aircraft 
Osage City Municipal Airport is a public-use airport located two miles northeast of the central business district of Osage City, a city in Osage County, Kansas, United States. The airport is owned and operated by the City of Osage City.

The airport covers an area of 126 acres and has one asphalt paved runway designated 17/35, which measures 3,300 by 60 feet (1,006 x 18 meters). It also has a turf runway designated 04/22, which measures 2,250 by 100 feet (686 x 30 meters).

Osage City Municipal Airport is primarily used for general aviation purposes, including private and business flights, flight training, and recreational flying. The airport has a fixed-base operator (FBO) that provides services such as fueling, aircraft maintenance, and hangar rental.

In addition to its aviation activities, Osage City Municipal Airport is also used for community events and gatherings. The airport hosts an annual fly-in breakfast and car show, which is open to the public and attracts aviation enthusiasts and classic car owners from the surrounding area.

Overall, Osage City Municipal Airport is an important transportation hub for the city of Osage City and the surrounding region, providing convenient and efficient access to air travel for both local residents and visitors to the area.

References

External links 
 Osage City Municipal Airport (53K) at Kansas DOT Airport Directory
 Aerial image as of October 1991 from USGS The National Map
 
 

Airports in Kansas
Buildings and structures in Osage County, Kansas